Chad Basin campaign may refer to:

The conquests of Rabih az-Zubayr
French conquest of Chad
German conquest of northern Cameroon
2015 West African offensive, counter-insurgency campaign by an international coalition against Boko Haram
Chad Basin campaign (2018–2020), a series of offensives by Boko Haram, the Islamic State, and an international coalition against both of them